Jonny Edgar (born 13 February 2004) is an English racing driver currently racing in the 2023 FIA Formula 3 Championship for MP Motorsport. He was both a member of the Red Bull Junior Team and the 2020 ADAC Formula 4 champion.  He is the cousin of F1 Academy driver Jessica Edgar.

Career

Karting
Born in Whitehaven, Edgar started his career in 2012, being in the fourth generation of Edgars to practice motor racing. Edgar began his karting career with Fusion Motorsport in Britain, finishing second in the Super 1 National Championship just three years after his debut. He also won the SKUSA SuperNationals that year, driving for Team Benik. His karting highlight came in 2017, when he won the CIK-FIA European Championship in the OKJ-category on his first attempt, having beaten the likes of Hadrien David, Zane Maloney and Jack Doohan. In Edgar's final year of karting he managed to finish third in the WSK Super Master Series, having remained with Forza Racing.

Lower formulae

2019 
In 2019, Edgar made his car racing debut in the Italian F4 Championship, driving for Jenzer Motorsport, whilst also competing in selected rounds of the ADAC Formula 4 Championship as a guest driver. He scored two podiums, namely a second-place finish at Imola and third at Mugello. Edgar scored a further two pole positions and two fastest laps, and with 97 points the Red Bull Junior finished 10th in the standings.

2020 

Edgar would continue to race in both the Italian and German Formula 4 Championships, however, due to the COVID-19 pandemic he would only compete part-time in the former. He signed for Van Amersfoort Racing, partnering fellow Red Bull Junior Team member Jak Crawford. The British driver would end up winning the ADAC Formula 4 Championship with a gap of just two points to Crawford, while in the Italian Championship he would finish fourth, winning at Imola and the season finale in Vallelunga, despite having missed two race weekends.

FIA Formula 3 Championship

2021 

In October 2020 Edgar completed the first post-season test at Catalunya, running for MP Motorsport. Later that month, the Dutch outfit once again fielded Edgar in the second post-season test at Jerez. In December, Edgar partook in a test with the Carlin team at Algarve. At the start of January, Edgar was announced to drive for Carlin in the 2021 season, partnering Ido Cohen and Kaylen Frederick. He qualified 12th and thus started on pole on his debut as a result of reverse grid, and finishing that race in fifth place gave him his first points in Formula 3. The Briton's most successful round came at the Red Bull Ring where he, after only qualifying in 18th place, finished sixth, fifth and tenth in the races respectively. Unfortunately, Edgar didn't manage to score any further points after that round and ended up 18th in the standings, having scored all but two points of Carlin that year. However in September 2021, Edgar was nominated for the Autosport BRDC Award and was selected as one of the four finalists together with Louis Foster, Ollie Bearman and eventual winner Zak O'Sullivan.

2022 
In November 2021, Edgar switched to reigning team champions Trident for the post-season test at Catalunya, driving alongside Roman Staněk and rookie Zane Maloney. After further testing during the winter, Edgar was confirmed with the Italian outfit in January for the 2022 season. Having been picked as one of the title favourites, it was a surprise when Edgar finished outside of the top ten in both races of the opening round. However, he later revealed that he had been diagnosed with Crohn's disease, which caused major weight loss during the winter and made driving immensely difficult. Edgar opted to pull out of the championship following that round, claiming that he "[needed] to take some time out to prioritise [his] health. After missing the rounds at Imola and Barcelona, the Brit returned for the fourth round at Silverstone, having "improved sufficiently" to return to racing. In the feature race, he scored his first points of the season with an eighth place finish. He would continue his points-scoring form into the following round in Austria, where he ended up seventh in the sprint race, however a collision caused by Caio Collet at the Safety car restart in the feature race prevented another points finish. A scoreless round at Budapest came next, although Edgar would finish off the season in a positive manner, scoring points in all of the remaining six races, being the only driver to manage this feat. Edgar ended up twelfth in the standings, having helped Trident to the runner-up spot in the teams' championship and become the highest placed driver to have missed at least two rounds.

After the end of the season, Edgar took part in the post-season test, partnering Franco Colapinto and Mari Boya at MP Motorsport.

2023 
Edgar remained in Formula 3 for the 2023 season, this time moving to MP Motorsport after a successful test.

Formula One 
In September 2017, Edgar was named as one of four new signings to the Red Bull Junior Team, alongside Dennis Hauger, Jack Doohan and Harry Thompson. However at the start of 2023, Edgar was announced to be leaving the junior team.

Personal life 
Edgar is the cousin of racing driver Jessica Edgar. They are part of the fourth generation of Edgars to practice motor racing. In April 2022 Jonny Edgar was diagnosed with Crohn's disease.

Karting record

Karting career summary

Complete CIK-FIA Karting European Championship results 
(key) (Races in bold indicate pole position) (Races in italics indicate fastest lap)

Complete Karting World Championship results

Racing record

Racing career summary

† As Edgar was a guest driver, he was ineligible to score points.
* Season still in progress.

Complete Italian F4 Championship results
(key) (Races in bold indicate pole position) (Races in italics indicate fastest lap)

Complete ADAC Formula 4 Championship results
(key) (Races in bold indicate pole position) (Races in italics indicate fastest lap)

† As Edgar was a guest driver, he was ineligible to score points.

Complete FIA Formula 3 Championship results 
(key) (Races in bold indicate pole position; races in italics indicate points for the fastest lap of top ten finishers)

References

External links
 
 

2004 births
Living people
British racing drivers
Italian F4 Championship drivers
FIA Formula 3 Championship drivers
ADAC Formula 4 drivers
ADAC Formula 4 champions
Sportspeople from Whitehaven
Carlin racing drivers
Spanish F4 Championship drivers
Jenzer Motorsport drivers
Van Amersfoort Racing drivers
Trident Racing drivers
Karting World Championship drivers
MP Motorsport drivers
People with Crohn's disease